The Three Sharp Peaks of Hong Kong are a collection of three peaks that Hong Kong hikers deem as very challenging to summit because of loose rocks and steep inclination.  The peaks are Castle Peak (583m) in Tuen Mun, Sharp Peak (468m) in Sai Kung and High Junk Peak (344m) in Clear Water Bay. The three peaks are scattered in different regions in Hong Kong.  While Castle Peak is the tallest of the three, Sharp Peak is generally considered the hardest of the three to hike up because of its remoteness and steepness.

Three Sharp Peaks of Sai Kung 
Hikers also have another list of three peaks called the Three Sharp Peaks of Sai Kung (District), a popular hiking spot in Hong Kong.  They are the aforementioned Sharp Peak, High Junk Peak and the remote Tai Yue Ngam Teng (233m) peak.

See also 
 List of mountains, peaks and hills in Hong Kong
 Castle Peak
 Sharp Peak
 High Junk Peak

References

External links 
 Wilson Trail